9TV Daybreak (formerly known as Solar Daybreak) was the English-language morning hard-news newscast of 9TV. It featured daily headlines as well as national and local news, weather, traffic, sports, foreign, and entertainment stories. Its initial telecast was on October 1, 2012, on TalkTV, airing weekdays from 7:00 am to 8:30 am (UTC+8:00). It was one of the retained programs upon TalkTV's conversion into Solar News Channel.

On January 7, 2013, Amelyn Veloso from TV5, joined as new co-anchor and replaced Jing Magsaysay. But Veloso left Daybreak in May 2014, when she was placed as the host of the public service program Serbisyo All Access, and was replaced by Hilary Isaac. On October 1, 2014, on the day of the show's 2nd anniversary, Amelyn Veloso became the permanent replacement anchor for Claire Celdran. Claudine Trillo then joined the program as its co-anchor.

Daybreak ceased airing on March 13, 2015, as part of the channel's transition into CNN Philippines. It was replaced by Headline News from March 16.

Final anchors
Amelyn Veloso (deceased)
Hilary Isaac
Claudine Trillo

Sit-in anchors
Menchu Macapagal
Nicolette Henson-Hizon

Former anchors
Claire Celdran
Roanna Jamir
Jing Magsaysay
Pat Fernandez (Weather and Entertainment)
Rod Nepomuceno

See also
Solar Entertainment Corporation
Solar TV Network
Solar News Channel
Solar News and Current Affairs
Solar Newsday
Solar Network News
Solar Nightly News
Solar Headlines

References

Philippine television news shows
2012 Philippine television series debuts
2015 Philippine television series endings
CNN Philippines original programming
Solar News and Current Affairs
Radio Philippines Network original programming
Breakfast television in the Philippines
English-language television shows